Passoré is one of the 45 provinces of Burkina Faso, located in its Nord Region. Its capital is Yako.

Education
In 2011 the province had 316 primary schools and 39 secondary schools.

Healthcare
In 2011 the province had 42 health and social promotion centers (Centres de santé et de promotion sociale), 3 doctors and 73 nurses.

Departments
Passoré is divided into 9 departments:

See also
Regions of Burkina Faso
Provinces of Burkina Faso
Departments of Burkina Faso

References

 
Provinces of Burkina Faso